Billboard Most-Played Race Records of 1947 is a year-end chart compiled by Billboard magazine ranking the year's top race records based on the number of times the record was played on the nation's juke boxes.Billboard assigned point totals to each record based on its juke box plays. 

Louis Jordan and His Tympany Five dominated the year-end chart with 10 ranked records, including the No. 1 record ("Ain't Nobody Here but Us Chickens") and five of the top ten.

Four separate recordings of the song "Open the Door, Richard!" were included on the year-end chart, including versions by Louis Jordan and His Tympany Five and Count Basie and His Orchestra.

"That's My Desire" by Frankie Laine was the only record by a white singer to make the list, ranked at No. 20. A cover of the song by the Hadda Brooks Trio ranked No. 25.

Billboard also awarded point totals to each of the labels with Decca (Louis Jordan's label) receiving 433 points, followed by Capitol (including Capitol Americana) with 120 points and Manor and Mercury with 77 points each.

See also
Billboard year-end top singles of 1947
Billboard Most-Played Folk Records of 1947
1947 in music

References

1947 record charts
Billboard charts
1947 in American music